Mabil may refer to:

Awer Mabil (born 1995), Australian footballer
Mabil FC, South Sudanese football club